Nova Emetivka (Ukrainian: Нова Еметівка) is a village in Ukraine, Odesa Raion, Odesa Oblast. It belongs to Usatove rural hromada, one of the hromadas of Ukraine and is one of 15 villages of the hromada. Nova Emetivka has a population of 374. It was founded because of the Constituency 139.

Until 18 July 2020, Nova Emetivka belonged to Biliaivka Raion. The raion was abolished in July 2020 as part of the administrative reform of Ukraine, which reduced the number of raions of Odesa Oblast to seven. The area of Biliaivka Raion was merged into Odesa Raion.

Population Census 

As of January 12, 1989, Nova Emetivka had a population of 437 (438 for constant). 209 of them are men and 228 are women (229 for constant).

As of December 5, 2001, Nova Emetivka has a population of 404.

Language 
It shows the language distribution. There are languages that are in Nova Emetivka.

See also 
 Usatove

References

Villages in Odesa Raion
Usatove Hromada